The Association for Nutrition (AfN) is the voluntary regulator for nutritionists and nutrition scientists in the United Kingdom.

The association is a registered charity and is custodian of the United Kingdom Voluntary Register of Nutritionists (UKVRN)

Its purpose is to "Protect and benefit the public by defining and advancing standards of evidence-based practice across the field of nutrition and at all levels within the workforce".

The Association for Nutrition and the UKVRN is acknowledged by Public Health England, NHS Careers, NHS Choices  and the National Careers Service  as the professional body for nutritionists in the UK.

The Chief Executive is Helen Clark.

The register 

All registrants on the UKVRN have had to provide evidence of their training and professional nutrition experience. They have also committed to abide by a Standard of Ethics, Conduct and Performance. There are three categories of UKVRN registrants, Registered Nutritionist (RNutr) with nutrition specialism in public health, nutrition science, sport & exercise, food or animal nutrition, Registered Associate Nutritionist (ANutr) and Fellow of AfN (FAfN).

Registered Associate Nutritionists 

Registered Associate Nutritionists (post-nominals: ANutr) are recent graduates, who have been able to demonstrate a sound foundation of knowledge and understanding in nutrition science, and are working towards gaining sufficient experience within a specialist area to become a Registered Nutritionist (RNutr).

Registered Nutritionists 

Registered Nutritionists (post nominals RNutr) have been assessed as having demonstrated that they have met rigorously applied knowledge, understanding and practice core competencies set by the AfN. They commit to keeping their knowledge up to date and ensuring they follow evidence-based practice.

Fellows of the Association for Nutrition 

Fellows (FAfN) have been Registered Nutritionists (RNutr) for at least five years and have been recognised by their peers to have made a significant and sustained contribution to the advancement of nutrition practice, research or education at a national or international level.

References

External links 

 

 
Health in the London Borough of Camden
Learned societies of the United Kingdom
Organisations based in the London Borough of Camden